Admiral Edmund Frederick Jeffreys CVO (1 October 1846 – 19 March 1925) was a Royal Navy officer who became Senior Officer, Coast of Ireland Station.

Naval career
Jeffreys became commanding officer of the cruiser  in July 1888 and commanding officer of the battleship  in June 1893. He went on to be commanding officer of the Gunnery School  in November 1895, Director of Naval Ordnance at the Admiralty in August 1897 and Senior Officer, Coast of Ireland Station in February 1901. The Senior Officer was based at Queenstown, and had the port guard ship there as his flagship.

He retired in January 1904.

References

1846 births
1925 deaths
Royal Navy admirals
Commanders of the Royal Victorian Order